A smartwatch is a wearable computer in the form of a watch; modern smartwatches provide a local touchscreen interface for daily use, while an associated smartphone app provides management and telemetry, such as long-term biomonitoring. While early models could perform basic tasks, such as calculations, digital time telling, translations, and game-playing, smartwatches released since 2015 have more general functionality closer to smartphones, including mobile apps, a mobile operating system and WiFi/Bluetooth connectivity. Some smartwatches function as portable media players, with FM radio and playback of digital audio and video files via a Bluetooth headset. Some models, called watch phones (or phone watches), have mobile cellular functionality such as making telephone calls.

While internal hardware varies, most have an electronic visual display, either backlit LCD or OLED. Some use transflective or electronic paper, to consume less power.  They are usually powered by a rechargeable lithium-ion battery. Peripheral devices may include digital cameras, thermometers, accelerometers, pedometers, heart rate monitors, altimeters, barometers, compasses, GPS receivers, tiny speakers, and microSD cards, which are recognized as storage devices by many other kinds of computers.

Software may include digital maps, schedulers and personal organizers, calculators, and various kinds of watch faces. The watch may communicate with external devices such as sensors, wireless headsets, or a head-up display. Like other computers, a smartwatch may collect information from internal or external sensors and it may control, or retrieve data from, other instruments or computers. It may support wireless technologies such as Bluetooth, Wi-Fi, and GPS. For many purposes, a "watch computer" serves as a front end for a remote system such as a smartphone, communicating with the smartphone using various wireless technologies. Smartwatches are advancing, especially their design, battery capacity, and health-related applications.
Health-related applications include applications measuring heart rate, SpO2, workout, etc.

History

Early years 
The first digital watch, which debuted in 1972, was the Pulsar manufactured by Hamilton Watch Company. "Pulsar" became a brand name which would later be acquired by Seiko in 1978. In 1982, a Pulsar watch (NL C01) was released which could store 24 digits, making it most likely the first watch with user-programmable memory, or "memorybank" watch.

With the introduction of personal computers in the 1980s, Seiko began to develop computers in the form of watches. The Data 2000 watch (1983) came with an external keyboard for data-entry. Data was synced from the keyboard to the watch via electro-magnetic coupling (wireless docking). The name comes from its ability to store 2000 characters. Its memory was tiny, at only 112 digits. It was released in 1984, in gold, silver and black. These models were followed by many others by Seiko during the 1980s, most notably the "RC Series". The RC-1000 Wrist Terminal was the first Seiko model to interface with a computer, and was released in 1984, subsequently priced at around £100, providing 2 KB of storage and a two-line 12-character display, transferring data from a computer using an RS232C interface. It was developed by Seiko Epson and was powered by a computer on a chip and was compatible with most of the popular PCs of that time, including Apple II, II+ and IIe, BBC Micro, Commodore 64, IBM PC, NEC 8201, Tandy Color Computer, Model 1000, 1200, 2000 and TRS-80 Model I, III, 4 and 4p. The RC-20 Wrist Computer was released in 1985, under the joint brand name "Seiko Epson". This was followed by the RC-4000 and RC-4500.

During the 1980s, Casio began to market a successful line of "computer watches", in addition to its calculator watches. Most notable was the Casio data bank series. Novelty "game watches", such as the Nelsonic game watches, were also produced by Casio and other companies.

Although pager watches were predicted in the early 1980s, such products became more evident towards the end of the decade, with two products introduced by separate collaborations: Motorola and Timex producing the Wrist Watch Pager, and AT&E Corp. and Seiko producing the MessageWatch.

1990s 
The Timex Datalink wristwatch, was introduced in 1994. The early Timex Datalink Smartwatches realized a wireless data transfer mode to receive data from a PC. Appointments and contacts created with Microsoft Schedule+, the predecessor of MS Outlook, could be easily transmitted to the watch via a screen blinking light protocol.

In early 1990s HMT Limited, the Indian state-run watch company, launched their first batch of digital watches, named 'Astra' which was sold in Indian market like hot cakes, even in black.

In 1998, Steve Mann invented, designed, and built the world's first Linux wristwatch, which he presented at IEEE ISSCC2000 on 7 February 2000, where he was named "the father of wearable computing". See also Linux Journal, where Mann's Linux wristwatch appeared on the cover and was the feature article of LJ Issue 75. Seiko launched the Ruputer in Japan – a wristwatch computer with a 3.6 MHz processor. It was not very successful, since instead of a touchscreen it used a joystick-like device to input characters (much like high scores in arcade games), and the small screen with a resolution at 102x64 in 4 greyscales made it hard to read large amounts of text. Outside of Japan, this watch was distributed as the Matsucom onHand PC. Despite the rather low demand, the Matsucom onHand PC was distributed until 2006, making it a smartwatch with a rather long life cycle. Ruputer and onHand PC applications are fully compatible. This watch is sometimes considered the first smartwatch as it was the first one to offer graphics display (albeit monochrome) and many 3rd party applications (mostly homebrew).

In 1999, Samsung launched the world's first watch phone, the SPH-WP10. It had a protruding antenna, a monochrome LCD screen, and a 90-minutes of talk time with an integrated speaker and microphone.

2000s 

In June 2000, IBM displayed a prototype for the WatchPad, a wristwatch that ran Linux. The original version had only 6 hours of battery life, which was later extended to 12. It featured 8 MB of memory and ran Linux 2.2. The device was later upgraded with an accelerometer, vibrating mechanism, and fingerprint sensor. IBM began to collaborate with Citizen Watch Co. to create the "WatchPad". The WatchPad 1.5 features a 320 × 240 QVGA monochrome touch sensitive display and runs Linux 2.4. It also features calendar software, Bluetooth, 8 MB of RAM and 16 MB of flash memory. Citizen was hoping to market the watch to students and businessmen, with a retail price of around $399. Epson Seiko introduced their Chrono-bit wristwatch in September 2000.  The Chrono-bit watches have a rotating bezel for data input, synchronize PIM data via a serial cable, and can load custom watch faces.

In 2003, Fossil released the Wrist PDA, a watch which ran the Palm OS and contained 8 MB of RAM and 4 MB of flash memory. It contained a built in stylus to help use the tiny monochrome display, which had a resolution of 160×160 pixels. Although many reviewers declared the watch revolutionary, it was criticized for its weight (108 grams) and was discontinued in 2005.

In the same year, Microsoft announced the SPOT smartwatch and it began hitting stores in early 2004. SPOT stands for Smart Personal Objects Technology, an initiative by Microsoft to personalize household electronics and other everyday gadgets. For instance, the company demonstrated coffee makers, weather stations, and alarm clocks featuring built-in SPOT technology. The device was a standalone smartwatch that offered information at a glance where other devices would have required more immersion and interaction. The information included weather, news, stock prices, and sports scores and was transmitted through FM waves. It was accessible through a yearly subscription that cost from $39 to $59.

The Microsoft SPOT Watch had a monochrome 90×126 pixel screen. Fossil, Suunto, and Tissot also sold smartwatches running the SPOT technology. For instance, Fossil's Abacus, which was a variant of the Fossil Wrist PDA, retailed from $130 to $150.

Sony Ericsson teamed up with Fossils, and released the first watch, MBW-100, that connected to Bluetooth. This watch notified the user when receiving calls and text messages. Though the watch was not popular as it would only connect and work with Sony Ericsson phones.

In 2009, Hermen van den Burg, CEO of Smartwatch and Burg Wearables, launched Burg the first standalone smartphone watch with its own SIM card and not requiring to be tethered to a smartphone. Burg received the award for the Most Innovative Product at the Canton Fair in April 2009 Also, Samsung launched the S9110 Watch Phone which featured a  color LCD display and was  thin.

2010s 

Sony Ericsson launches the Sony Ericsson LiveView, a wearable watch device which is basically an external Bluetooth display for an Android Smartphone.

Vyzin Electronics Private Limited launched a ZigBee enabled smart watch with cellular connectivity for remote health monitoring called VESAG.

Motorola released MOTOACTV on 6 November 2011.

Pebble (watch) was an innovative smartwatch that raised the most money at the time on Kickstarter reaching $10.3 Million between 12 April – 18 May 2012. The watch has a  144 × 168 pixel black and white memory LCD using an ultra low-power "transflective LCD" manufactured by Sharp with a backlight, a vibrating motor, a magnetometer, ambient light sensors, and a three-axis accelerometer. It can communicate with an Android or iOS device using both Bluetooth 2.1 and Bluetooth 4.0 (Bluetooth Low Energy) using Stonestreet One's Bluetopia+MFi software stack. Bluetooth 4.0 with low energy (LE) support was not initially enabled, but a firmware update in November 2013 enabled it. The watch is charged using a modified USB-cable that attaches magnetically to the watch to maintain water resistance capability. The battery was reported in April 2012 to last seven days. Based on feedback from Kickstarter backers, the developers added water-resistance to the list of features.

In 2013, the claim to first ever smartwatch to capture the full capability of a smartphone was laid by startup Omate with the TrueSmart. The TrueSmart originated from a Kickstarter campaign which raised over 1 million dollars, making it the 5th most successful Kickstarter to date. The TrueSmart made its public debut in early 2014. Consumer device analyst Avi Greengart, from research firm Current Analysis, suggested that 2013 may be the "year of the smartwatch", as "the components have gotten small enough and cheap enough" and many consumers own smartphones that are compatible with a wearable device. Wearable technology, such as Google Glass, was speculated to evolve into a business worth US$6 billion annually, and a July 2013 media report revealed that the majority of major consumer electronics manufacturers were undertaking work on a smartwatch device at the time of publication. The retail price of a smartwatch could be over US$300, plus data charges, while the minimum cost of smartphone-linked devices may be US$100.

As of July 2013, the list of companies that were engaged in smartwatch development activities consists of Acer, Apple, BlackBerry, Foxconn/Hon Hai, Google, LG, Microsoft, Qualcomm, Samsung, Sony, VESAG and Toshiba. Some notable omissions from this list include HP, HTC, Lenovo, and Nokia. Science and technology journalist Christopher Mims identified the following points in relation to the future of smartwatches:

 The physical size of smartwatches is likely to be large.
 Insufficient battery life is an ongoing problem for smartwatch developers, as the battery life of devices at the time of publication was three to four days and this is likely to be reduced if further functions are added.
 New display technologies will be invented as a result of smartwatch research.
 The success level of smartwatches is unpredictable, as they may follow a similar trajectory to netbooks, or they may fulfill aims akin to those of Google Glass, another wearable electronic product.

Acer's S.T. Liew stated in an interview with gadget website Pocket-Lint, "... I think every consumer company should be looking at wearable. Wearable isn’t new … it just hasn’t exploded in the way that it should. But the opportunity’s for billions of dollars' worth of industry."

As of 4 September 2013, three new smartwatches had been launched: the Samsung Galaxy Gear, Sony SmartWatch 2, and the Qualcomm Toq. PHTL, a company based in Dallas, Texas, completed its crowd-funding process on Kickstarter for its HOT Watch smartwatch in September 2013. This device enables users to leave their handsets in their pockets, since it has a speaker for phone calls in both quiet and noisy environments. In a September 2013 interview, Pebble founder Eric Migicovsky stated that his company was not interested in any acquisition offers. Two months later, he revealed that his company has sold 190,000 smartwatches, most of which were sold after its Kickstarter campaign closed.

Motorola Mobility CEO Dennis Woodside confirmed that his company is working on a smartwatch during a December 2013 interview. Woodside showed an awareness of the difficulties that other companies have experienced with wrist-wearable technologies.

In April 2014, the Samsung Gear 2 was released among the few smartwatches to be equipped with a digital camera. It has a resolution of two megapixels and can record video in 720p.

At the 2014 Consumer Electronics Show, a large number of new smartwatches were released from various companies such as Razer Inc, Archos, and several other companies, as well as a few startups. Some had begun to call the 2014 CES, a "wrist revolution" because of the number of smartwatches released and the huge amount of publicity they began to receive at the start of 2014. At Google I/O on 25 June 2014, the Android Wear platform was introduced and the LG G Watch and Samsung Gear Live were released. The Wear-based Moto 360 was announced by Motorola in 2014. At the end of July, Swatch's CEO Nick Hayek announced that they will launch a Swatch Touch with smartwatch technologies in 2015. In the UK, the Wearable Technology Show made its debut in London and was host to several smartwatch companies exhibiting their newest models.

The launch of Samsung's Gear S smartwatch was covered by the media in late August 2014. The model features a curved Super AMOLED display and a built-in 3G modem, with technology writer Darrell Etherington stating on the TechCrunch website, "we’re finally starting to see displays that wrap around the contours of the wrist, rather than sticking out as a traditional flat surface." The corporation commenced selling the Gear S smartwatch in October 2014, alongside the Gear Circle headset accessory. At IFA 2014 Sony Mobile announced the third generation of its smartwatch series, the Sony Smartwatch 3 powered by Android Wear. Also, the Fashion Entertainments' e-paper watch was announced.

On 9 September 2014, Apple Inc. announced its first smartwatch, called Apple Watch, to be released in early 2015. On 24 April 2015, Apple Watch began shipping across the world. Apple's first try into wearable technology was met with considerable criticism during the pre-launch period, with many early technology reviews citing issues with battery life and hardware malfunctions. However, others praised Apple for creating a potentially fashionable device that can compete with "traditional watches," not just the smartwatch industry in general. The watch only turns on when activated (either by lifting one's wrist, touching the screen, or pressing a button). On 29 October 2014, Microsoft announced the Microsoft Band, a smart fitness tracker and the company's first venture into wrist-worn devices since SPOT (Smart Personal Objects Technology) a decade earlier. The Microsoft Band was released at $199 the following day, on 30 October 2014.

In October 2015, Samsung unveiled the Samsung Gear S2. It features a rotating bezel for ease of use, and an IP68 rating for water resistance up to 1.5 meters deep in 30 minutes. The watch is compatible with industry-standard 20 mm straps.

At the 2016 Consumer Electronics Show, Razer released the Nabu Watch, a dual-screen smartwatch. The first screen integrates an always-on illuminated backlit display and handles standard features such as date and time. The second OLED screen, activated by raising one's wrist, allows access to extra smart features. Luxury watchmaker TAG Heuer released TAG Heuer Connected, a smartwatch powered by Android Wear.

On 31 August 2016, Samsung unveiled the Samsung Gear S3 smartwatch, with higher specifications. There are at least two models: the Samsung Gear S3 Classic and the LTE version Samsung Gear S3 Frontier.

The top smartwatches that debuted at the 2017 Consumer Electronics Show included the Casio WSD-F20, Misfit Wearables Vapor and the Garmin Fenix 5 series. On 22 September 2017 Apple released their Apple Watch Series 3 model which offers built in LTE cellular connectivity allowing phone calls, messaging and data without relying on a nearby smartphone connection.

In 2018, Samsung introduced the Samsung Galaxy Watch series.

In its September 2018 keynote, Apple introduced a redesigned Apple Watch Series 4. It featured a larger display with smaller bezels, as well as an EKG feature which is built to detect abnormal heart function.

In Qualcomm's September 2018 presentation, it unveiled its Snapdragon 3100 chip. It is a successor to the Wear 2100, and it includes greater power efficiency, and a separate low power core that can run basic watch functions as well as slightly more advanced functions, such as step tracking.

2020s

In 2020, the United States Food and Drug Administration granted marketing approval for an Apple Watch app called NightWare. The app aims to improve sleep for people suffering from PTSD-related nightmares, by vibrating when it detects a nightmare in progress based on monitoring heart rate and body movement.

Market and popularity
Smartwatches have risen in popularity during the 2010s. Today, they are often used as fitness trackers, smartphone entertainment or communication "companions". Global smartwatch shipments counted 14 million in the third quarter of 2019. As of 2019 the market leader was Apple, followed by Samsung, Imoo, Fitbit, Amazfit, Huawei, Fossil and Garmin.

Typical features 

Many smartwatch smartphone models manufactured in the 2010s are completely functional as standalone products. Some are used in sports, the GPS tracking unit being used to record historical data. For example, after a workout, data can be uploaded onto a computer or online to create a log of activities for analysis or sharing. Some watches can provide full GPS support, displaying maps and current coordinates, recording tracks, and bookmarking locations. With Apple, Sony, Samsung, and Motorola introducing smartwatch models, 15 percent of tech consumers use wearable technologies, which has attracted advertisers. Advertising on wearable devices was expected to increase heavily by 2017 as advanced hypertargeting modules were introduced to the devices; companies aim to use advertisements tailored for smartwatches.

"Sport watch" functionality often includes activity tracker, or fitness tracker, features as included on GPS watches made for training, diving, and outdoor sports. Functions may include training programs (such as intervals), lap times, speed display, GPS tracking unit, route tracking, dive computer, heart rate monitor compatibility, Cadence sensor compatibility, and compatibility with sport transitions (as in triathlons). Other watches can cooperate with an app in a smartphone to carry out their functions.  They are paired usually by Bluetooth with a smartphone.  Some of these only work with a phone that runs the same mobile operating system; others use a unique watch OS, or otherwise are able to work with most smartphones.  Paired, the watch may function as a remote to the phone.  This allows the watch to display data such as calls, SMS messages, emails, calendar invitations, and any data that may be made available by relevant phone apps. Some fitness-tracker watches give users reports on the distance walked, hours slept, and so on.

LTE

From about 2015 several manufacturers released smartwatches with LTE support (watch smartphones or autonomous vs. connected watches), enabling direct connection to 3G/4G mobile networks for voice and SMS use, without the need to carry a paired smartphone.

Prices
 smartwatches by the best-known providers sold for prices of typically several hundreds of pounds in the UK. There were also ultra-cheap watches, selling for prices typically between £2.07 and £30, which had security and other issues. There were also good watches costing less than £100 without all the features of the top models, but performing well in tests and meeting privacy and security assessments.

Security and other issues
Tests by UK consumer organisation Which? found by detailed testing that ultra-cheap smartwatches and fitness trackers sold online had serious security flaws including excessive data collection, data not stored securely, no way to opt out of data collection, and no security lock function to lock out thieves or other unauthorised users. Typically a watch app might request permission to collect and store "personally identifiable information and personal property information", such as information on passport, transactions, bank balances, and ID cards; the app is unusable if permission is denied. The user cannot know if information is being stored securely, and it cannot be deleted. There is no control over whether the supplier views it or sells it on, for whatever purpose. In many cases data collected is not encrypted when transmitted to the supplier.

Which? did not specifically test functionality of ultra-cheap watches, but while checking security they noticed that some displayed heart rate, blood oxygen measurements, and counted steps while not being worn or moved; they said that this "suggests they are at best inaccurate and at worst useless".

In the UK a Product Security and Telecoms Infrastructure Act was passed in December 2022, effective from 2024. The Act, which should cover smartwatches, specifies security standards which manufacturers, importers and distributors (including online marketplaces) of smart devices must meet.

Operating systems

AsteroidOS

AsteroidOS is an open source firmware replacement for some Android Wear devices.

Flyme OS
Flyme OS, firmware based on Android operating system by Meizu.

InfiniTime
InfiniTime is the default firmware for the PineTime smartwatch, produced by Pine64. It is a community project based on FreeRTOS, as well as being free software licensed under the GNU General Public License. It supports Android, desktop Linux, the PinePhone, and SailfishOS as companion devices for features such as music playback, call/text notifications, navigation instructions, and time synchronization.

As of January 2022, Infinitime version 1.8's additional features include: secure Bluetooth pairing, customisable watch faces, a flashlight, basic paint program, stopwatch, alarm clock, countdown timer, step counter, heart rate monitor, a one-player pong clone, a numerical puzzle game and a metronome. Features are under ongoing development, with firmware updates available via Github.

HarmonyOS

HarmonyOS is an operating system developed by Huawei, intended for the various "smart" devices they manufacture. Starting in 2021, it started seeing use in Huawei Watches, replacing its predecessor, LiteOS.

Sailfish OS

Sailfish OS is a Linux-based operating system for various platforms, including Sailfish smartwatches.

Tizen

Tizen is a Linux-based operating system for various platforms including smartwatches. Tizen is a project within the Linux Foundation and is governed by a Technical Steering Group (TSG) composed of Samsung and Intel among others. Samsung released the Samsung Gear 2, Gear 2 Neo, Samsung Gear S, Samsung Gear S2 and Samsung Gear S3 running Tizen.

watchOS

watchOS is a proprietary mobile operating system developed by Apple Inc. to run on the Apple Watch.

Wear OS

Wear OS, previously known as Android Wear, is a smartwatch operating system developed by Google Inc.

For children and the elderly

In China, since around 2015, smartwatches have become widely used by schoolchildren. They are advertised on television throughout China as a safety device whereby the child can call in case of emergency. The devices are commonly colorful and made of plastic. They normally have no display unless a button is pushed. These smartwatches have limited functionality, mainly being able to conduct calls, and display time, and sometimes air temperature. They cost around US$100 to $200.

Children's smartwatches are also sold in other countries.

Some smart watches can also help elderly or disabled people, reporting their location to a caretaker if they fall or become lost.

See also

References

External links 

Mobile computers

Personal digital assistants
Human–computer interaction
Ubiquitous computing
Personal computers
Embedded Linux
Navigational equipment
Japanese inventions
Wearable computers
Wearable devices